Tritoxa pollinosa is a species of picture-winged fly in the genus Tritoxa of the family Ulidiidae.

Distribution
United States.

References

Ulidiidae
Insects described in 1919
Diptera of North America